Pesochny is a municipal settlement in Kurortny District of the federal city of St. Petersburg, Russia, located on the Karelian Isthmus, on the northern shore of the Gulf of Finland.  Population: 

Until 1925, it was called Grafskaya koloniya (lit. Colony of the earl), or Grafskoye for short.  Its Finnish name "" is derived from that name.

References

Municipal settlements under jurisdiction of Saint Petersburg
Karelian Isthmus
Kurortny District